1st NYFCC Awards
Announced January 2, 1936  Presented March 2, 1936

Best Film: 
The Informer
The 1st New York Film Critics Circle Awards, announced on 2 January 1936, presented March 2, 1936, honored the best filmmaking of 1935.

Winners

Best Picture 
The Informer

Best Director
John Ford – The Informer
Runner-up – Alfred Hitchcock – The Man Who Knew Too Much and  The 39 Steps

Best Actor
Charles Laughton – Mutiny on the Bounty and Ruggles of Red Gap
Runner-up: Victor McLaglen – The Informer

Best Actress
Greta Garbo – Anna Karenina
Runner-up: Katharine Hepburn – Alice Adams

External links
1935 Awards

New York Film Critics Circle Awards
New York Film Critics Circle Awards
New York Film Critics Circle Awards
New York Film Critics Circle Awards
New York Film Critics Circle Awards